The Williams Brothers is an American traditional black gospel music group from Jackson, Mississippi, they were formed in 1960 by Leon "Pop" Williams, who was the Williams' father, and early on the Williams' brother Frank Douglas was a member. At its inception, The group consisted of three brothers, Doug Williams, Leonard Williams, Melvin Williams, and their cousin, Henry Green and a non-family member Maurice Surrell. Later on the group would add Derrick Horne, Maulty "Tuff" Jewell IV, Pharis "June Bug" Evans Jr., Ralph Lofton Jr., and Terrell Midge Gatlin. They released 42 albums with various labels during their tenure, and 23 albums charted on the Billboard charts, mostly on the Gospel Albums chart. They have been nominated for the Grammy Award in the Best Traditional Gospel Album category at the 34th, 37th, 43rd, 47th, and the 52nd Annual Grammy Awards. In 1999, the group was inducted into the International Gospel Music Hall of Fame, which is in Detroit, Michigan.

Background
The Jackson, Mississippi-based traditional black gospel group, The Williams Brothers  started in 1960 by Leon "Pop" Williams (November 24, 1908/1909 – September 6, 1989), who was the father of the Williams Brothers and an early member of the group, died in a car accident. Another early member of the group was Franklin Delano Williams (born June 27, 1947 and Died: March 22, 1993, Savannah, GA). At their origination, they were made up of three brothers, Doug Williams, Leonard Williams (born July 1, 1951), Melvin Williams, and their cousin, Henry Green. Over the years, the group added Derrick Horne, Maulty "Tuff" Jewell IV, Pharis "June Bug" Evans Jr., Ralph Lofton, and Terrell Midge Gatlin to their rostrum.

History
The group released 42 albums with a myriad of labels from 1960 until 2014, and those labels were the following: Word Records, Nashboro Records, Savoy Records, CBS Records International, New Birth Records, Malaco Records, A&M Records, Melendo Records, Blackberry Records, Compendia Records, Warner Bros. Records, Myrrh Records, and MCA Records. They have had 23 albums chart on the Billboard magazine charts, mainly on the Gospel Albums chart, and those were the following: Feel the Spirit, Blessed, Hand in Hand, A New Beginning, Ain't Love Wonderful, The Is Your Night, The Williams Brothers Greatest Hits Volume 1, The Williams Brothers, The Best Of And More "Live", In This Place, Still Standing, The Concert, Still Here, SoulLink Live, Greatest Hits Plus, Soullink Live 3: Man in the Mirror, On Broken Pieces: A Hurricane Relief Effort, The Journey Continues, My Brother's Keeper, Celebrating 50 Years, Live At The Hard Rock: Part I, My Brother's Keeper II, and Songs Of Worship, Praise & Deliverance. The group has received five Grammy Award nominations during their tenure in the Best Traditional Gospel Album category, at the 34th edition for the album This Is Your Night, at the 37th edition for In This Place, at the 43rd edition for The Concert, at the 47th edition for Still Here, and at the 52nd edition for The Journey Continues. In 1999, the group was inducted into the International Gospel Music Hall of Fame, which is located in Detroit, Michigan.

Members
Current
Andre "Dray" Tate
 Doug Williams
 Melvin Williams
 Henry Green (born March 23, 1943, Smithville, Mississippi)
Former
 Leon "Pop" Williams
 Leonard Williams
 Franklin Delano Williams
 Maurice Surrell
 Derrick Horne
 Maulty "Tuff" Jewell IV
 Pharis "June Bug" Evans Jr.
 Ralph Lofton
 Terrell Midge Gatlin

Discography
(*) – Denotes a Grammy Award nomination, for that particular album

Concept music videos 
 "I'm Just a Nobody"
 "Sweep Around"
 "I'm Too Close" (featuring Stevie Wonder)
 "Still Here"
 "Move in Me"
 "Use Me" (featuring Tim Rogers, Stan Jones and Lisa Knowles)

References

External links
 Official facebook
 Malaco Records profile

American gospel musical groups
Musical groups established in 1960
Musical groups from Mississippi
Musicians from Jackson, Mississippi
1960 establishments in Mississippi